Bandla Ganesh, also known as Ganesh (born 10 March 1973), was an Indian actor, and film producer of Telugu cinema. In 2009, he ventured into film production with the film, Anjaneyulu under his production company, Parameswara Art Productions.

At the age of six, Ganesh settled in Shadnagar. His father was a poultry farmer. Ganesh was first inspired to act by Pawan Kalyan's appearance in 1998's Suswagatham. Ganesh started his career as a comedian in Telugu industry, mainly in Puri Jaggannadh's films.

Bandla Ganesh produced the film Gabbar Singh, which was a commercial success. He admires Pawan Kalyan very much, which he publicly displayed at multiple occasions and also in his emotional speech in the Gabbar Singh movie audio launch event.

Filmography

As Producer

As actor
Vinodam (1996)
Aahvaanam (1997)
Sindhooram (1997)
Ugadi (1997)
Master (1997)
Snehithulu (1998)
Suswagatham (1998)
Manasulo Maata (1998)
Sorry Aunty (2001)
Nuvvu Naaku Nachav (2001)
Amma Nanna O Tamila Ammayi (2003)
Sivamani (2003)
Athade Oka Sainyam (2004)
Malliswari (2004)
Pokiri(2006)
Oka V Chitram (2006)
Yogi (2007)
Tulasi (2007)
Chirutha  (2008)
Chintakayala Ravi (2008)
Nuvvu Vasthavani  (2008)
Businessman (2012)
Sarileru Neekevvaru (2020)
Crazy Uncles (2021)
Degala Babji (2022)
Son of India (2022)

Awards 
CineMAA Award for Best Film - Gabbar Singh (2013)

References

External links

Ganesh Babu on Moviebuff

Tamil male actors
Telugu male actors
Telugu film producers
Indian male film actors
Male actors from Hyderabad, India
Living people
Tamil comedians
Telugu comedians
Indian male comedians
Film producers from Hyderabad, India
1973 births